Ledward is a surname, and may refer to:

 Daphne Ledward (born 1945), English gardener
 Gilbert Ledward (1888–1960), English sculptor
 Jack Ledward (1909–1997), Australian cricketer and cricket administrator
 Richard Arthur Ledward (1857–1890), English sculptor, father of Gilbert Ledward
 Thomas Ledward, figure of the Mutiny on the Bounty